This is a List of converts to Islam from paganism.

 Baraq - ruler of the Chagatai Khanate who took the name Ghiyas-ud-din after converting.
 Berke - grandson of Genghis Khan and leader of the Golden Horde who was the first Mongol ruler to establish Islam in a Mongol state.
 Nogai Khan - Mongol general and great-grandson of Genghis Khan.
 Sultan Satuq Bughra Khan - 9th century Uyghur ruler who was one of the first Turks to convert to Islam.
 Tuda Mengu - Mongol leader of the Golden Horde
 David Myatt - from paganism, former Neo-Nazi-activist
 Nawrūz (Mongol emir) - convert to Islam; he played an important role in the politics of the Mongol Ilkhanate.
 Negudar - Mongol general and noyan
 Samori Ture - founder of the Wassoulou Empire who resisted French rule in West Africa.
 Tughlugh Timur - Khan of Moghulistan.

See also
List of Sahaba

References

Paganism
Islam from paganism